William Kenrick (1795–1872) was an American nurseryman.  When 28 years of age he was taken into partnership by his father, a pioneer nurseryman, whose gardens were planted in 1790 upon the ground where John Eliot commenced preaching the gospel to the Native Americans.  Perhaps Kenrick will be best remembered on account of his introduction of the white mulberry, and the active part he took in the attempt to establish the silk industry in America.

Works
The new American orchardist; or, An account of the most valuable varieties of fruit, adapted to cultivation in the climate of the United States, from the latitude of 25 [degrees] to 54 [degrees], with their uses, modes of culture, and management; remedies for the maladies to which they are subject, from noxious insects, and other causes, &c. Also, a brief description of the most ornamental forest trees, shrubs, flowers, &c, 1833
The American silk growers guide, or, The art of raising the mulberry and silk and the system of successive crops in each season, 1835.

References
 

American orchardists
1795 births
1872 deaths
19th-century American botanists
Nurserymen